Audrey's Meadow is a   nature reserve in Newbury in Berkshire. It is owned by West Berkshire Council and managed by the Berkshire, Buckinghamshire and Oxfordshire Wildlife Trust.

Geography and site
Audrey's Meadow contains a mixture of improved and semi-improved neutral grassland and wet woodland with ponds.

History
In 2011 the meadow was adopted as a public open space and named after one of the parish councilors, Mrs Audrey Appleby. In 2014 it was transferred from West Berkshire Council to the Berkshire, Buckinghamshire and Oxfordshire Wildlife Trust.

Fauna
The site has the following fauna:

Amphibians
Common frog

Invertebrates
Aeshna grandis
Polyommatus icarus
Anax imperator
Ochlodes sylvanus
Maniola jurtina
Chorthippus parallelus
Aphantopus hyperantus
Metrioptera roeselii
Argynnis paphia
Thymelicus sylvestris
Argiope bruennichi

Birds
Parus caeruleus
Parus major
Poecile palustris
Turdus philomelos

Flora
The site has the following flora:

Lamiastrum galeobdolon
Melica uniflora
Anemone nemorosa
Conopodium majus
Lathyrus pratensis
Vicia sepium
Hyacinthoides non-scripta

References

Parks and open spaces in Berkshire
Nature reserves in Berkshire
Berkshire, Buckinghamshire and Oxfordshire Wildlife Trust